White heath aster is a common name for several plants native to North America and may refer to:

Symphyotrichum ericoides
Symphyotrichum pilosum